Brasiliana is a monotypic genus of planthopper in the family Fulgoridae, presently comprising a single species Brasiliana fusca, known from Brazil.

References

Poiocerinae
Insects of Brazil
Insects described in 1959